The  Ukrainian Free University is a private graduate university located in Munich, Germany.

History
The Ukrainian Free University (UFU) was established in Vienna on 17 January 1921. The  idea to organize  a Ukrainian university-in-exile came from Ukrainian academics, some of  whom had held chairs at universities in the Russian and Austro-Hungarian Empires.  UFU was transferred to Prague, Czechoslovakia in the  fall of 1921.  The host government granted UFU full academic accreditation and provided the University with financial support. UFU received wide recognition for significant and productive teaching, research and publications during its Prague period.

After the  Second  World War, UFU established its seat in Munich, Germany. On 16 September 1950, the Free State of Bavaria Ministerial decree guaranteed degree-granting privileges. In the ensuing period, various Bavarian university laws and ministerial decrees reaffirmed this academic privilege. Federal German and Bavarian governmental financial support contributed towards worthwhile research, publishing and teaching activities. The University became a recognized Western European scholarly centre, specializing in the study of Ukraine within the USSR and of Ukrainians in the diaspora. Emphasis  was  placed on the study of Ukrainian history, literature, culture, law and politics. German and  Bavarian financial aid ceased in the  years following Ukrainian independence, as it was assumed that patronage of the  University  would be assured by Ukraine. The Ukrainian Ministry of Education recognized UFU doctoral decrees in November 1992. To date, Ukrainian governmental funding have not materialized. Thus, since 2009, the Ukrainian Free University relies entirely on its own resources.

Over the years, the University has evolved from a "university-in-exile" to a full-fledged, though highly specialized, European Union graduate school. Nevertheless, UFU has retained much of its remarkableness and  singularity. In its research and publishing  activities, the University focuses primarily on Ukraine and things Ukrainian.

Academic structures 
The University has three academic structures. The Faculty of Ukrainian Studies concentrates on interdisciplinary Ukrainian studies. Culture, literature and history constitute the core of  Ukrainian studies.  The  Faculty of Philosophy houses the remaining humanitarian disciplines, such as philosophy, fine arts, music, teacher training and  religion.  The Faculty of Government and  Political Economy unites such social science disciplines as political science, economics and business, sociology, psychology and legal studies.

Academic programs 
UFU is the only private university in the world which, while located outside of Ukraine, offers graduate programs of study in the social sciences and the humanities, primarily in Ukrainian language.  In fact, in order to be able to matriculate at UFU one must demonstrate fluency in Ukrainian.  Masters programs require two to three semesters of  course work, an MA  thesis and  an oral thesis  defense.  Doctoral programs stipulate three semesters of course work, a doctoral dissertation,  philosophy comprehensives and  an oral thesis  defense. Dissertations are normally written in Ukrainian.  In exceptional cases, permission may be granted to  write in another language.  Winter Semester teaching period runs from early November to mid-December and from the end of January until early March.  Summer Semester teaching period is from early May until the end of July.

Most UFU faculty members also hold simultaneously permanent academic positions at European Union, American, Canadian and Ukrainian institutions of higher learning.

Notable alumni and faculty
Volodymyr Kubiyovych (1900–1985), Ukrainian geographer, cartographer, encyclopedist, politician, and statesman.
Viktor Petrov
 Nataliia Polonska-Vasylenko
 Jaroslav Rudnyckyj
 Ivan Horbachevsky
 George Yurii Shevelov
 Igor Kaczurowskyj
 Emma Andijewska
 Liubomyr Vynar
 Serhiy Kvit
 Leonid Rudnytzky
 Stefania Turkewich

References

Bibliography
 "Universitas Libera Ucrainensis: 1921–2006", Mykola Szafowal and Roman Yaremko (eds.), ( Munich: Ukrainische Freie Universität, 2006) Series: Varia № 52.

External links
  Ukrainian Free University official website
 Volodymyr Yaniv, Ukrainian Free University in the Encyclopedia of Ukraine

 
1921 establishments in Austria
Universities and colleges in Munich
Ukrainian diaspora in Germany
Educational institutions established in 1921
Universities and colleges in Vienna
Education in Prague
Ukrainian language
Ukrainian studies
Minority schools
Relocated schools